Ein Stück Himmel is a German television series based on Janina David's autobiography A Square of Sky: A Jewish Childhood in Wartime Poland.

See also
List of German television series

External links
 

World War II television series
1982 German television series debuts
1982 German television series endings
Television shows set in Poland
German-language television shows
Das Erste original programming
Grimme-Preis for fiction winners
Films directed by Franz Peter Wirth